Timothy Joseph O'Donovan (4 April 1881 – 28 June 1957) was a Farmers' Party and Fine Gael politician from County Cork in Ireland. He was a Teachta Dála (TD) from 1923 to 1944, then a senator from 1944 until 1954, serving as Cathaoirleach of Seanad Éireann from 1948 to 1951.

O'Donovan was elected at the 1923 general election to the 4th Dáil as a Farmers' Party TD for the Cork West constituency. He was re-elected at seven further general elections until his defeat at the 1944 general election to the 12th Dáil, after several changes of party affiliation. After the demise of the Farmers' Party in the 1920s, he was re-elected in 1933 as a National Centre Party TD, and when the National Party merged with Cumann na nGaedheal to form Fine Gael, he joined the new party.

After the loss of his Dáil seat in 1944, he was elected at the subsequent Seanad Éireann election to the 5th Seanad, on the Agricultural Panel. He was re-elected in 1948 to the 6th Seanad, serving as Cathaoirleach (chairperson) of the Seanad from 1948 to 1951. He died in 1957.

References

1881 births
1957 deaths
Farmers' Party (Ireland) TDs
National Centre Party (Ireland) TDs
Fine Gael TDs
Cathaoirligh of Seanad Éireann
Members of the 4th Dáil
Members of the 5th Dáil
Members of the 6th Dáil
Members of the 7th Dáil
Members of the 8th Dáil
Members of the 9th Dáil
Members of the 10th Dáil
Members of the 11th Dáil
Members of the 5th Seanad
Members of the 6th Seanad
Members of the 7th Seanad
Politicians from County Cork
Irish farmers
Fine Gael senators